Martin Pieckenhagen (born 15 November 1971 in East Berlin) is a German former professional footballer. He is the sporting director of Hansa Rostock.

Over the course of his career, he played for 1. FC Union Berlin, Tennis Borussia Berlin, MSV Duisburg, Hansa Rostock, Hamburger SV, Heracles Almelo, and 1. FSV Mainz 05. He absolved 215 games in the German Bundesliga.

After retiring
After retiring, Pieckenhagen started as a youth coach at 1. FSV Mainz 05. In the beginning of 2013, Pieckenhagen worked as the assistant coach of SV Waren 09. He only worked there until the summer 2013, where he was released. 

On 21 January 2014, Pieckenhagen was appointed as the sporting director at FC Mecklenburg Schwerin. The contract was only for six months, and it was further extended after the six months.

From January 2015 to 13 October 2016, Pieckenhagen was also the manager of the club alongside his sporting director role. He left the club on 9 May 2017, to join Würzburger Kickers.

On 9 May 2017, Pieckenhagen was hired by Würzburger Kickers as a goalkeeper coach.

On 5 January 2019, Pieckenhagen was appointed as the sporting director of F.C. Hansa Rostock.

Honours
Hamburger SV
DFL-Ligapokal: 2003

References

External links
 
 

1971 births
Living people
German footballers
Footballers from Berlin
Association football goalkeepers
Bundesliga players
2. Bundesliga players
Eredivisie players
1. FC Union Berlin players
Tennis Borussia Berlin players
MSV Duisburg players
FC Hansa Rostock players
Hamburger SV players
Heracles Almelo players
1. FSV Mainz 05 players
1. FSV Mainz 05 II players
FC Hansa Rostock non-playing staff
German expatriate footballers
German expatriate sportspeople in the Netherlands
Expatriate footballers in the Netherlands